Cavernago is a comune (municipality) in the Province of Bergamo in the Italian region of Lombardy, located about  northeast of Milan and about  southeast of Bergamo.

Cavernago borders the municipalities of Calcinate, Ghisalba, Grassobbio, Seriate, Urgnano, and Zanica. It is home to the Malpaga Castle, a Renaissance fortress owned by the condottiero and local lord Bartolomeo Colleoni. Another castle, that of Cavernago proper, was later remade in the 17th century in Baroque style.

References